WZNT (93.7 FM), branded on-air as Zeta 93, is a radio station broadcasting a Spanish Tropical format. Licensed to San Juan, Puerto Rico, it serves the Puerto Rico area.  The station is currently owned by Spanish Broadcasting System Holding Company, Inc.

External links

ZNT
Radio stations established in 1959
1959 establishments in Puerto Rico
Spanish Broadcasting System radio stations
ZNT